Christopher Todd Gilbert (born October 19, 1970) is an American politician currently serving as Speaker of the Virginia House of Delegates. He has been a Republican member of the Virginia House of Delegates since 2006, representing the 15th district in the Shenandoah Valley and Blue Ridge Mountains, made up of Page and Shenandoah Counties, plus parts of Rockingham and Warren Counties.

Early life and education

Gilbert was born in Newton, Texas. He graduated in 1989 from Central High School in Woodstock, Virginia, where he served as student body president and played three varsity sports. He attended the University of Virginia, where he earned a bachelor's degree in government in 1993. While at UVA, he was a legislative intern in the Capitol Hill office of then U.S. Representative George Allen.

Upon graduation, he attended the Southern Methodist University School of Law, where he earned his J.D. degree in 1996 and led the student body as president of the Student Bar Association. While at SMU Law, Gilbert won the school's annual mock trial competition and participated on the school's competitive mock trial team.

Early career
Gilbert began his career as a full-time prosecutor. His first job was with the Office of the Commonwealth's Attorney for the City of Lynchburg, where he was a member of the Violent Crime Prosecution Team. In 1999, he returned home to work in the Office of the Commonwealth's Attorney for Shenandoah County for six years, where he was lead prosecutor in a number of major cases.

Political career

Virginia House of Delegates

Elections
He was first elected to represent the 15th district in the Virginia House of Delegates in 2005.

Tenure
In 2010, Gilbert was appointed to be Deputy Majority Leader of the House of Delegates.

Gilbert became the Virginia House of Delegates Majority Leader on January 10, 2018, as Republicans maintained their majority following the 2017 elections. He was chosen by the House Republican Caucus following their decision to promote current House Majority Leader Kirk Cox to Speaker of the Virginia House of Delegates.

Following the 2019 Virginia House of Delegates election, Gilbert became the Minority Leader-designate following Democrats retaking the majority in the House of Delegates.

When the Republicans regained control of the House of Delegates following the 2021 elections, Gilbert became Speaker of the House of Delegates.

Committee assignments
Agriculture
Finance
Rules

Other assignments
Virginia State Crime Commission

Personal life
Todd Gilbert is married to Jennifer Wishon Gilbert.  He is a member of the First Baptist Church of Woodstock. Outside of his political functions in Richmond, Gilbert also has a private law practice.

Awards and honors
Some of Gilbert's awards and honors:
Virginia YMCA "Service to Youth Award"
Family Foundation "Legislator of the Year"
Virginia Association of Commonwealth's Attorneys "Champion of Justice Award"
Virginia Association of Chiefs of Police "Legislator of the Year"
Virginia State Police Association "Legislator of the Year"
American Conservative Union "Defender of Liberty"
Virginia Chamber of Commerce "Champion of Free Enterprise"
Virginia Chamber of Commerce "Advocate in Legal Reform Award"

Electoral history

Notes

External links
 (campaign finance)

|-

|-

1970 births
21st-century American politicians
Baptists from Texas
Baptists from Virginia
Living people
People from Mount Jackson, Virginia
People from Newton, Texas
Southern Methodist University alumni
Speakers of the Virginia House of Delegates
Republican Party members of the Virginia House of Delegates
University of Virginia alumni
Virginia lawyers